Amy Helm (born December 3, 1970) is an American singer-songwriter and musician. She is the daughter of drummer Levon Helm and singer Libby Titus. She is a past member of the Levon Helm's Midnight Ramble Band and Ollabelle, as well as her own touring band.

Her debut solo album, Didn’t It Rain, was released in July 2015, and her second release This Too Shall Light was released September 2018 on Yep Roc Records.

Helm conducted an in-depth interview about her life and career with The Pods & Sods Network in 2016.  That year she and her band performed at the Edmonton Folk Music Festival.

Early life
Helm was born in Woodstock, New York, United States, and spent her childhood between Woodstock, Los Angeles, and New York City.  She attended Trinity High School where she studied jazz with Dr. Aaron Bell, while singing in bands, playing in New York City clubs and bars.

Music career
In 1999, Helm joined her father in his blues band The Barn Burners.  They toured the country playing traditional blues music.

In 2001, she was a co-founding member of alt-country ensemble Ollabelle, which toured and recorded for 10 years, releasing three critically acclaimed albums, Ollabelle (2004), Riverside Battle Songs (2006), and Neon Blue Bird (2011).

In 2004, she and her father built the Midnight Ramble concerts at his home in Woodstock, New York. The concerts began as a rent party and grew into a Woodstock institution, featuring artists such as Emmylou Harris, Allen Toussaint, Elvis Costello, Phil Lesh, and many others.

Growing out of the Midnight Rambles, Levon Helm recorded his first album in 25 years, Dirt Farmer, which was produced by Amy and Larry Campbell. Dirt Farmer went on to win the Grammy award for Best Traditional Folk Album in February 2008. In 2009, they recorded Electric Dirt, which won the first-ever Grammy award for Best Americana Album in 2010.  She also was a part of the live album Ramble at the Ryman, recorded in 2008 at the Ryman Auditorium in Nashville. This album won the 2012 Grammy award for Best Americana Album.

Helm has extensive credits as a background vocalist and whistler on records by artists such as Steely Dan, Mercury Rev, Linda Thompson, William Bell, Rich Robinson, and Rosanne Cash.

In 2015, she released her first solo album, Didn't It Rain which featured her father's last recorded drum performances. The album also featured members of the Midnight Ramble Band and Amy's touring band, as well as other players and singers such as John Medeski, Bill Payne, and Catherine Russell.

In 2017, Helm recorded her second album with producer Joe Henry in Los Angeles. The album features musicians Doyle Bramhall II, Tyler Chester, Jen Condos, and Jay Bellerose, as well as a background vocal section consisting of Allison Russell, JT Nero, and Adam Minkoff. The album, entitled This Too Shall Light, was released on September 21, 2018 on Yep Roc Records. The album's title track premiered on Rolling Stone Country.

Helm currently tours year round with her own band and continues to perform and produce concerts at Levon Helm Studios in Woodstock, the home of the Midnight Ramble.

Personal life
Helm resides in Woodstock, New York. She is the stepdaughter of Donald Fagen from the band Steely Dan through his marriage to Libby Titus in 1993.

Discography

Studio albums
2015: Didn’t It Rain
2018: This Too Shall Light
2021: What the Flood Leaves Behind

Appearances

1980 – Various Artists: In Harmony – A Sesame Street Record
1993 – Donald Fagen – Kamakiriad
1998 – Mercury Rev – Deserter's Songs
1998 – The Band – Jubilation
1998 – Levon Helm & The Crowmatix – Souvenir, Vol. 1
2000 – Steely Dan – Two Against Nature
2001 – Mercury Rev – All Is Dream
2002 – Shivaree – Rough Dreams
2002 – Christine Lavin – I Was In Love With A Difficult Man
2003 – Ivo – All In All
2004 – Ollabelle – Olabelle
2004 – Trans-Siberian Orchestra – The Lost Christmas Eve
2004 – Sean Costello – Sean Costello
2004 – Kenny White – Symphony In 16 Bars
2004 – Eugene Ruffolo – The Hardest Easy
2004 – Jay Collins Band – Poem For You Today
2005 – Laura Cantrell – Humming By The Flowered Vine
2005 – Shivaree – Who’s Got Trouble?
2005 – Liz Tormes – Limelight
2005 – The Levon Helm Band – The Midnight Ramble Sessions Vol .2
2006 – Chris Smither – Leave The Light On
2006 – Ollabelle – Riverside Battle Songs
2006 – Donald Fagen – Morph The Cat
2006 – John Flynn – Two Wolves
2007 – Levon Helm – Dirt Farmer
2007 – The Holmes Brothers – State Of Grace
2007 – The Alexis P. Suter Band – Live At The Midnight Ramble
2008 – Donna The Buffalo – Silverlined
2008 – Arlen Roth – Toolin’ Around Woodstock
2008 – Ollabelle – Before This Time
2008 – Helm, Hudson & McCoy – Angels Serenade
2009 – Levon Helm – Electric Dirt
2009 – Ben Sidran – Dylan Different
2010 – Elizabeth Mitchell – Sunny Day
2011 – Blackie And The Rodeo Kings – Kings And Queens
2011 – Matt Andersen – Coal Mining Blues
2011 – Ollabelle – Neon Blue Bird
2011 – Various Artists – The Lost Notebooks Of Hank Williams
2011 – Levon Helm – Ramble At The Ryman
2011 –  & Mika Kuokkanen – Powderburn
2013 – Linda Thompson – Won’t Be Long Now
2013 – Various Artists – Love For Levon: A Benefit To Save The Barn
2014 – Rosanne Cash – The River & The Thread
2014 – The Levon Helm Band – It’s Showtime: The Midnight Ramble Sessions, Vol. 3
2014 – Matt Andersen – Weightless
2014 – Marcia Ball – The Tattooed Lady And The Alligator Man
2014 – Danielia Cotton – The Real Book
2015 – Larry Campbell & Teresa Williams – Larry Campbell & Teresa Williams
2015 – The Mike & Ruthy Band – Bright As You Can
2015 – Tracy Bonham – Wax & Gold
2015 – Colin Linden – Rich In Love
2016 – William Bell – This Is Where I Live
2017 – Various Artists – Treasure Of The Broken Land: The Songs Of Mark Heard

References

External links
 
  
 
 

Living people
1970 births
American women singer-songwriters
21st-century American singers
Singer-songwriters from New York (state)
People from Woodstock, New York
21st-century American women singers
Yep Roc Records artists
Trinity School (New York City) alumni
Ollabelle members